The 2018–19 Vijay Hazare Trophy was the 17th season of the Vijay Hazare Trophy, a List A cricket tournament in India. Karnataka were the defending champions.

It was contested by 37 domestic cricket teams of India, starting on 19 September 2018, ahead of the 2018–19 Ranji Trophy. In April 2018, the Board of Control for Cricket in India (BCCI) reinstated Bihar for the competition, bringing the total teams to 29. In July 2018, the BCCI increased the total number of teams to 37, with the addition of Arunachal Pradesh, Manipur, Meghalaya, Mizoram, Nagaland, Pondicherry, Sikkim and Uttarakhand.

The tournament has four groups, with nine teams in Groups A and B, and ten teams in Group C. All the new teams were placed in the Plate Group. The top two teams from Group C and the top team in the Plate Group progressed to the quarter-finals of the tournament, along with five best-ranked teams across Groups A and B.

In the Group C fixture between Rajasthan and Jharkhand, Jharkhand's Shahbaz Nadeem set a new List A cricket record, taking eight wickets for ten runs from ten overs. In the Plate Group fixture between Bihar and Sikkim, Sikkim were bowled out for 46 runs, with Bihar winning by 292 runs, the biggest margin of defeat by runs in Indian domestic cricket. In the Plate Group fixture between Uttarakhand and Sikkim, Uttarakhand's Karn Kaushal made the first double-century in the history of the Vijay Hazare Trophy, scoring 202 runs.

Mumbai and Maharashtra from Group A, Delhi, Andhra and Hyderabad from Group B and Bihar from the Plate Group all qualified for the quarter-finals of the competition. They were joined with Haryana and Jharkhand from Group C. The draw for the quarter-finals took place on 11 October 2018.

In the first quarter-final match, between Bihar and Mumbai, Bihar were bowled out for 69 runs, with Mumbai going on to win by nine wickets. In the second match, Delhi beat Haryana by five wickets, with Delhi's Gautam Gambhir scoring his 10,000th run in List A cricket. In the third fixture, Jharkhand beat Maharashtra by two wickets in a rain-affected match. In the fourth and final quarter-final match, Hyderabad beat Andhra by 14 runs to progress.

The first semi-final was also a rain-affected match, with Mumbai beating Hyderabad by 60 runs via the VJD method. In the second semi-final, Delhi beat Jharkhand by two wickets to join Mumbai in the final. Mumbai won the final, beating Delhi by four wickets. Afterwards Mumbai's captain, Shreyas Iyer, said that "we are a perfect team, and that is why we have won".

Teams
The teams were drawn in the following groups:

Group A
 Baroda
 Goa
 Himachal Pradesh
 Karnataka
 Maharashtra
 Mumbai
 Punjab
 Railways
 Vidarbha

Group B
 Andhra
 Chhattisgarh
 Delhi
 Hyderabad
 Kerala
 Madhya Pradesh
 Odisha
 Saurashtra
 Uttar Pradesh

Group C
 Assam
 Bengal
 Gujarat
 Haryana
 Jammu & Kashmir
 Jharkhand
 Rajasthan
 Services
 Tamil Nadu
 Tripura

Plate Group
 Arunachal Pradesh
 Bihar
 Manipur
 Meghalaya
 Mizoram
 Nagaland
 Pondicherry
 Sikkim
 Uttarakhand

League stage

Group A

Group C

Group B

Plate Group

Knockout stage

Quarter-finals

Semi-finals

Final

References

External links
 Series home at ESPN Cricinfo

Vijay Hazare Trophy
Vijay Hazare Trophy
Vijay Hazare Trophy